The European Men's and Women's Artistic Gymnastics Individual Championships are an artistic gymnastics championships for male and female gymnasts from European countries organised by the European Union of Gymnastics. It was first held in 2005 and has been held biennially since then in odd-numbered years. These championships occur in years between the European Men's Artistic Gymnastics Championships and the European Women's Artistic Gymnastics Championships, which have been held in even-numbered years since 1990.

Championships

All Medals (2005 - 2021)

See also
 European Artistic Gymnastics Championships
 European Men's Artistic Gymnastics Championships
 European Women's Artistic Gymnastics Championships

References

 
 

 
Recurring sporting events established in 2005
Men's sports competitions in Europe
Women's sports competitions in Europe